For the public official in Idaho see Charles Marshall Hays

Charles Hays (February 2, 1834 – June 24, 1879) was a U.S. Representative from Alabama.

Biography
Hays was born at "Hays Mount," in Greene County, Alabama near Boligee where he completed preparatory studies under private teachers.

He attended the University of Georgia at Athens and the University of Virginia at Charlottesville.

He was a cotton planter in Greene County and also engaged in other agricultural pursuits before becoming a delegate to the Democratic National Convention at Baltimore in 1860.

Hays was elected as a Republican to the Forty-first and to the three succeeding Congresses (March 4, 1869 – March 3, 1877) and served as chairman of the Committee on Agriculture (Forty-third Congress).

He died at his home, "Myrtle Hall," in Greene County, Alabama, June 24, 1879 and was interred in the family cemetery, "Hays Mount" plantation.

References
 Retrieved on 2008-02-13

External links

1834 births
1879 deaths
People from Boligee, Alabama
People of Alabama in the American Civil War
Farmers from Alabama
Republican Party Alabama state senators
Confederate States Army officers
University of Georgia alumni
University of Virginia alumni
Republican Party members of the United States House of Representatives from Alabama
19th-century American politicians